The Thurston County Courthouse in Olympia, Washington is the former headquarters of Thurston County. It was built in 1930 and has been listed on the National Register of Historic Places since 1981.

See also
 National Register of Historic Places listings in Thurston County, Washington

References

External links

1930 establishments in Washington (state)
County courthouses in Washington (state)
Courthouses on the National Register of Historic Places in Washington (state)
Government buildings completed in 1930
National Register of Historic Places in Thurston County, Washington